Furuberget is an independent record label founded in 2013 and based in Oslo, Norway. The label was created by musicians André Lersveen and Ole Torstein Hovig. The company name (literally 'the pine mountain') comes from the name of the forest in Hedmark where Lersveen grew up, Furuberget Nature Reserve.  In addition to their digital releases, Furuberget operates an online store through bandcamp for its vinyl releases. Furuberget has signed many artists including The Hallway and previously Ludvig Moon with Spellemannprisen winners as members. Vidar Norheim, former member of Liverpool band Wave Machines, is also signed to Furuberget with his solo EP. Uno Møller, formerly of pop band Team Me, released Lizards under Furuberget in February and his album will come under the label later in the month.

Current roster

ALMOSTHAPPY
Erick Ellectrick & His Fantasy Gang
Killer Kid Mozart
Magic Mirror
Mt. Mélodie
Posterboys
Sad Chloë
Spielbergs
Spring Breakers
Uno Møller
Vidar Norheim
Wild Fauna
Yobrepus

Discography

Furuberget uses bandcamp as well as iTunes and Spotify to distribute its digital releases and Tiger Record Shop in Oslo to distribute physical content worldwide.

Former Artists
Artists that were formerly part of Furuberget.

The Hallway
Hi Ho Mustachio
Ludvig Moon
Unnveig Aas

References

Record labels established in 2013
Norwegian independent record labels
2013 establishments in Norway